Deo Narain is a Fiji Indian politician who won the Suva City Indian Communal Constituency, one of the 19 seats reserved for Fiji citizens of Indian origin, for the Fiji Labour Party during the 1999 elections for the House of Representatives.

On 19 May 2000, he was among the 43 members of the People's Coalition Government, led by Mahendra Chaudhry, taken hostage by George Speight and his band of rebel Republic of Fiji Military Forces (RFMF) soldiers from the Counter Revolutionary Warfare Unit. He was released on 13 July 2000 after 56 days of captivity.

References

Fiji Labour Party politicians
Indian members of the House of Representatives (Fiji)
Fijian Hindus
Living people
1938 births
Politicians from Suva